is a passenger train station in the city of Chikusei, Ibaraki, Japan, operated by the third sector railway company Mooka Railway.

Lines
Higuchi Station is a station on the Mooka Line, and is located 6.6 rail kilometers from the terminus of the line at Shimodate Station.

Station layout
The station consists of a single side platform serving traffic in both directions. The station is unattended.

History
Higuchi Station opened on 14 March 1992.

Passenger statistics
In fiscal 2018, the station was used by an average of 28 passengers daily (boarding passengers only).

Surrounding area

See also
 List of railway stations in Japan

References

External links

 Mooka Railway Station information 

Railway stations in Ibaraki Prefecture
Railway stations in Japan opened in 1992
Chikusei